Cui Wenjuan (born 27 July 1982) is a retired wushu taolu athlete and member of the People's Liberation Army.

Career 
Cui made her international debut at the 2007 World Wushu Championships where she became the world champion in taijijian. A year later, she competed in the 2008 Asian Wushu Championships and won a gold medal in taijiquan. This was in preparation for the 2008 Beijing Wushu Tournament, where she won the gold medal in women's taijiquan. She became world champion at the  2007 World Wushu Championships. Cui then was a gold medalist in taijiquan and taijijian combined at the 2009 World Games and also at the 2009 National Games of China. Her last competition was at the 2009 East Asian Games where she won another gold medal in taijiquan and taijijian combined.

See also 

 China national wushu team

References

1982 births
Living people
Chinese wushu practitioners
Chinese sportswomen
Place of birth missing (living people)
Competitors at the 2008 Beijing Wushu Tournament
World Games bronze medalists
World Games medalists in wushu